The Toyota 4Runner is an SUV manufactured by the Japanese automaker Toyota and marketed globally since 1984, across five generations. The original 4Runner was a compact SUV and little more than a Toyota Hilux pickup truck with a fiberglass shell over the bed, but the model has since undergone significant independent development into a cross between a compact and a mid-size SUV. All 4Runners have been built in Japan at Toyota's plant in Tahara, Aichi, or at the Hino Motors (a Toyota subsidiary) plant in Hamura.

The name "4Runner" was created by copywriter Robert Nathan with the Saatchi & Saatchi advertising company as a play on the term "forerunner". The agency held contests to invent new names for Toyota's forthcoming vehicles. According to Toyota, the "4" described the vehicle's 4-wheel drive system while "Runner" was a reference to its all-terrain capabilities and how it could "run" off road.

For some markets, the Hilux Surf was replaced in 2005 by the similar Fortuner, which is based on the Hilux platform.

, the 4Runner is marketed in the Bahamas, Bolivia, Canada, Chile, Colombia, Costa Rica, El Salvador, Guatemala, Panama, Peru, the United States and Venezuela.

The 4Runner came in at number five in a 2019 study by iSeeCars.com ranking the longest-lasting vehicles in the US.


Predecessor: Toyota Trekker (N30; 1981–1983) 

The Trekker was one of the first prototype walk through conversions done to Toyota trucks in the early 1980s. They were similar to the successive 4Runner conversions done by Toyota, which started production in 1984, but were designed and built by Winnebago Industries with the approval of Toyota. The Trekker was no longer viable when Toyota started producing the 4Runner in 1984, having in essence acted as a marketing test vehicle for that vehicle.

The Trekker was produced from early 1981 through 1983. The Trekkers were all built on the short wheelbase Hilux chassis. All of the Trekkers were classified as SR5 by both Winnebago and Toyota, regardless of the actual VIN denotation. Originally there were to be a SR5 and Deluxe version of the Trekker, one with vented windows and one without. All 1981 Trekkers had vented canopy windows. Non-vented canopy windows were not installed on the Trekker until the 1982 model year. Unvented windows were installed due to leaking issues of a forward facing vent on the 1981 Trekkers canopy windows rather than the equipment level.

Toyota shipped all trucks from Japan as cab and chassis in order to avoid the 25% assembled truck customs tax. The trucks destined for production as Trekkers were shipped to the dealership handling the national distribution of the Trekker. From there they went to Winnebago to have the Trekker conversion installed, returned after completion to the dealership for national distribution. Most of the Trekker conversions sold went to the west coast of the United States.

The Trekker conversion consisted of a fiberglass tub, bed sides, a non-removable canopy and rear hatch. The kit included a folding rear seat that could be folded forward to lay flat and add cargo space to the back. There was no tailgate on the Trekkers. The factory Toyota vinyl cab headliner was replaced and matched to the custom rear canopy headliner.

About 1500 of the Trekkers were built and sold in the United States. An additional unknown number of Trekker kits, likely less than 200, were shipped to Canada to be installed on Canadian trucks at the dealerships. 20 to 30 of the Trekker kits were sold and shipped to Saudi Arabia for installation.

First generation (N60; 1983) 

For the first generation N60 series Hilux Surf and export specification 4Runner introduced in 1983, Toyota, instead of developing an entirely new model, modified the existing Hilux (N50/N60/N70) with short-bed pickup body. The Hilux had undergone a major redesign in 1983 for the 1984 model year. Changes included the removal of the panel with integrated rear window from behind the front seats, the addition of rear seats, and a removable fiberglass canopy. The implementation was borrowed from both the second generation Ford Bronco, and the Chevrolet K5 Blazer, both short-bed trucks with removable fiberglass shells over the rear sections and having bench seats installed in the back. Like the Bronco and the Blazer, the Hilux Surf/4Runner also did not have a wall attached to the front section behind front seats as the regular Hilux did. In that sense, all three vehicles were more than simply conventional pickup trucks with a fiberglass shell included.

Thus, the first generation is nearly mechanically identical to the Toyota Hilux. All first generation 4Runners had two doors and were indistinguishable from the pickups from the dashboard forward. Nearly all changes were to the latter half of the body; in fact, because the rear springs were not upgraded to bear the additional weight from the rear seats and fiberglass top, these early models tended to suffer from a sagging rear suspension.

In North America, they were sold from the 1984½ model year from May 1984. For this first year (March to July 1984 production), all models were equipped with black or white fiberglass tops. An SR5 trim package was offered that upgraded the interior: additional gauges, better fabrics, and a rear seat were standard with the package. All 1984 models were equipped with the carbureted 2.4 L 22R engine and were all available with a four-wheel-drive system that drove the front wheels through a solid front axle.

1985 (August 1984 production) saw the arrival of the electronically fuel-injected 2.4 L 22R-E (and 22R-EC with California emissions controls) I4 engine. This upped the horsepower numbers from 100 hp for the 22R, to 116 hp for the 22R-E Engine, though the carbureted engine remained available until 1988. Additionally, rear seats were available in all 1985 4Runner trim levels, not just the more upscale SR5.

In 1986, the Surf/4Runner underwent a major front suspension design change as it was changed from a solid front axle to the Hi-Trac independent front suspension. Track width was also increased by three inches. These changes made the trucks more comfortable on-road, and improved stability and handling. The new suspension also increased the space in the engine compartment (necessary to fit larger engines, such as the V6 introduced in 1987) but arguably decreased the truck's off-road capabilities. The North American specification Toyota Pickup also adopted this new suspension, but the regular Hilux for other markets at this point retained the more rugged and capable, if less refined, solid axle configuration. With the 1986 update, the Surf/4Runner grille changed from the three segment type to the two segment grille. Tops were color-matched on blue, red and some gold models, while other body colors were still sold with black or white tops.

A turbocharged version of the 22R-E engine (the 22R-TE) was also introduced in 1986, although this engine is significantly rarer than the base 22R-E. It appears that all turbocharged 4Runner models sold in the US were equipped with an automatic transmission, though a five-speed manual could still be ordered in the turbocharged pickups. Most turbocharged 4Runners were equipped with the SR5 package, and all turbo trucks had as standard a heavier rear differential later used in the V6 model. Low-option models had a small light in the gauge cluster to indicate turbo boost, while more plush vehicles were equipped with an all-digital gauge cluster that included a boost gauge. Turbocharged and naturally aspirated diesel engines were also available in the pickups at this time as well, but it appears that no diesel-powered 4Runners were imported to the United States.

During 1984 to 1986 many 4Runners were imported to the US without rear seats. With only two seats the vehicle could be classified as a truck (rather than a sport vehicle) and could skirt the higher customs duties placed upon sport and pleasure vehicles. Most had aftermarket seats and seat belts added by North American dealers after they were imported.

In 1988, the 22R-E engine was joined by an optional 3.0 L V6 engine, the 3VZ-E. This engine was significantly larger and more powerful although not as reliable as the original 4-cylinder offering. Trucks sold with the V6 engine were equipped with the same heavy duty rear differential that was used in the turbocharged trucks, as well as a completely new transmission and transfer case; the transfer case was chain driven, although considered less rugged, created less cab noise than the old gear-driven unit used behind the four-cylinder engine.

An engine which was not used in the US market and rarely in the Japanese domestic market pickups was the 3Y engine, which was used in place of the 22R engine in New Zealand models, followed more rarely by the 4Y 2.2 L gasoline in later versions. This was a decision by Toyota New Zealand to reduce parts required to be stocked by dealers as no other Toyotas sold in New Zealand at the time utilised the R series engines.

Small cosmetic and option changes were made in 1988 for the 1989 model year, but the model was left largely untouched in anticipation of the replacement model then undergoing final development.

Second generation (N120/N130; 1989) 

Toyota issued a second generation of Hilux Surf and 4Runner in 1989 for the 1990 model year. Known as the N120/N130 series, these models continued their reliance on the Hilux pickup as a basis. It represented a fundamental departure from the first generation model. Instead of an enhanced pickup truck with fiberglass cap, the new 4Runners featured a freshly designed, full steel integrated body mounted on the existing frame. However, the 4Runner did remain virtually identical to the Hilux from the B-pillars forward. It also gained an all new coil spring rear suspension system, which unfortunately proved to be just as prone to sagging as the leaf springs on the rear of the previous models.

Nearly all second generation 4Runners were four-door models; however, from launch in 1989 to May 1993, a two-door model was also produced. These models are similar to the four-door models of the time in that the bodies were formed as a single unit, instead of the fiberglass tops used in the first generation 4Runners. Two-door cars of the second generation are extremely rare. US sales ended in August 1992, but it continued to be available in the Canadian market through 1993, and Japan until May 1993.

Because the drive train was still developed from the same source, the available engines and drivetrains were identical to the corresponding Hilux. The new 4Runner used the independent front suspension that had been developed on the previous generation. The older style gear driven transfer case was phased out on the V6 models and they now had a chain driven case. The older gear driven case was retained on the 4-cylinder models.

The Hilux Surf version for the Japanese market was also available with a range of diesel engines, including a 2.4 L turbodiesel 2L-TE I4 up to 1993, followed by a 3.0 L turbodiesel 1KZ-TE I4. Small numbers were also made with a normally aspirated 2.8 L diesel 3L I4, a 2.0 L 3Y I4 naturally aspirated gasoline engine, and 2.4 L 22R-E I4 gasoline engine. The majority of gasoline versions of the Hilux Surf received the 3.0 L V6. Various trim levels were offered in Japan ranging from the base model 'SSR' through 'SSR Ltd', 'SSR-V' 'SSR-X' and 'SSR-X Ltd' to the range topping 'SSR-G'.

Most other full-body SUVs produced at the time (e.g. Nissan Pathfinder, Ford Explorer) featured tailgates that opened upward with the glass closed. In contrast, the second generation 4Runner carried over the retractable-glass tailgate from the first generation. Opening these tailgates requires first retracting the rear window into the tailgate and then lowering the tailgate much like as on a pickup truck.

In 1991 for the 1992 model year, the 4Runner received minor cosmetic updates, including one-piece front bumpers and modular headlamps instead of the increasingly outdated rectangular sealed beams. This facelift distanced the 4Runner somewhat from the Hilux pickups which did not receive the same cosmetic changes. At this time a wide-body version was introduced featuring extended wheel arch flares along with wider wheels and tires.

Additional cosmetic changes occurred between 1993 and 1995, the last year of the second generation.

Safety 
The first and second generation 4Runners were both targeted as unsafe SUVs. 1980s and early-1990s crash regulations in the United States were not very strict for light trucks, and all early model 4Runners were fitted with doors that offered little protection in the event of a side collision. In most areas, there was little more than two pieces of sheet-metal and the window to keep incoming vehicles from impacting passengers. The crash test rating for the second generation 4Runner was one star for the driver's side in a frontal collision while the passenger side received a 4-star rating. Later, more strict crash regulations mandated doors that offered as much protection as passenger doors. In the United States, the 1994 and 1995 model years added side-impact beams in the doors.

Airbags for both the driver and passenger were added in 1995 (1996 model year).

Rear ABS had been an option until 1994 when it became standard on all 4 wheels.

Third generation (N180; 1995) 

Developed under chief Masaaki Ishiko from 1990 to 1995 under the project code 185T, in late 1995 (for the 1996 model year) a significant redesign of the 4Runner was introduced, with an all-new body shell on an all-new chassis. It shared many parts, including engine and transmission, with the new Tacoma, and sharing its chassis with the  Toyota Land Cruiser Prado (J90). Despite moving upmarket with the rest of the mid-size SUV market, the new 4Runner differentiated itself by retaining the rugged off-road character its competitors were sacrificing for highway comfort. 

The third generation 4Runner featured new engines shared with the first generation Toyota Tacoma pickup trucks:
 2.7L 3RZ-FE I4 replacing the previous 2.4L 22R-E I4;  max horsepower at 4800 rpm (an increase of ), and  max torque at 4000 rpm (an increase of );
 3.4L 5VZ-FE V6 replacing the previous 3.0L 3VZ-E V6;  horsepower at 4800 rpm (an increase of ), and  max torque at 3600 rpm (an increase of ).

In 1996, the 4Runner was dropped from sale in the UK, to be replaced by the Toyota Land Cruiser Prado, which was badged as the Toyota Land Cruiser Colorado.

Significant changes from the second generation models include a larger body on a longer wheelbase, increased interior space, increased cargo space, dual airbags, ABS, lift-up tailgate, coil-spring suspension all around, rack and pinion steering, and aerodynamic contour designed glass headlights. Additionally, Hilux Surf versions immediately moved to 16-inch wheels and gained a center differential, enabling the use of four-wheel drive on hard surfaces without complication for the first time. The prior system was retained to give on-the-fly shifting between rear- and four-wheel drive as before. The new 4Runner was also available with a factory installed selectable electric locker in the rear differential, a first for the 4Runner but available since 1993 in the Toyota Land Cruiser.

The 1997 model year received a few minor updates, including the addition of a color keyed cargo cover.

The 1998 model year remained largely unchanged, save for a few changes in the electronics. More ergonomic switch control panels and a newly designed 4 spoke steering wheel, which also necessitated a redesign of the airbag system.

For the 1999 model year, there were both major cosmetic and interior enhancements. A new "fat lip" bumper was designed to allow for an extended crush zone on the front of the frame, as well as new multi-parabola style headlights, projector style fog lamps, and updated side marker lights and front turn signals. Vehicles with "Limited" and "Highlander" (later called "Sport Edition") trim received color-keyed running boards, front and rear bumpers, mud flaps and flares. The ergonomics of the interior was completely changed, moving all the controls to the center of the dash for the rear window, and defrost, it also received a new instrument panel with a digital odometer. The Limited trucks also received a brand-new electronic temp control, and upgraded stereo. The multimatic transmission became available as an option for 4WD 4Runners for 1999, giving the option of AWD operation.

The 2000 model year would be the final year the 5-speed manual would be offered, leaving the 4-speed automatic as the sole transmission option. This would mark the last time any 4Runner would be offered with a manual transmission.

For the 2001 model year, the 4-cylinder option was discontinued in North America. It also received new transparent tail lights and new front grille design. The wheels were changed to a five-spoke design rim. Limited models received newly designed five spoke wheels as well, however different from SR5 and base model. Also included was a new, sleeker side view mirror design. SR5 and base model 4Runners also have redesigned climate control units utilizing 3 knobs and 2 buttons, contrary to the 1999 model's 2 sliders and 2 knobs. 2001 models were equipped with Vehicle Stability Control standard, and 4WD models came standard with the multimatic transmission. The optional e-locker for the rear differential was dropped in 2001.

The 2002 model year can be distinguished from the rear by their chromed lift gate exterior trim that encompasses the license plate.

Fourth generation (N210; 2002) 

The fourth-generation 4Runner incorporated serious changes to the chassis and body of the vehicle, but was targeted at approximately the same demographics as the third generation. Based on the Land Cruiser Prado 120 series, the new 4Runner retained the same basic exterior styling themes, and was still marketed as a mid-size semi-luxury SUV with off-road capabilities. Available trims were the SR5, Sport Edition, and Limited models. Fuel economy is estimated at 17 mpg city, 20 mpg highway for the V6 and 15/19 mpg for the V8. The 4Runner first entered dealer showrooms in October 2002 for the 2003 model year. Three trims levels were offered, SR5, Sport Edition, and Limited. When it was first introduced the SR5 and Sport Edition models used gray plastic cladding and bumpers. Sport models also featured a non-functional hood scoop.

The front suspension used a double wishbone while the rear is a solid rear axle type. The 4runner continued to use a body on frame construction design and a solid rear axle for strength and durability compromising interior room and on-road handling. Toyota's other mid-size SUV, the Highlander is a crossover which is not designed for off-roading. The optional 4WD systems were full-time on V8 models while "Multi-Mode" or part-time on V6 models, both systems used a lockable Torsen center differential. A new suspension system, X-Relative Absorber System (X-REAS), became standard on the Sport Edition and optional for SR5 and Limited models, a rear auto-leveling height adjustable air suspension is sometimes included with this option on Limited models. The X-REAS system links the dampers diagonally by means of hydraulic hoses and fluid using a mechanical center valve which reduces body roll during hard cornering. All 4runners were equipped with skid plates for the engine, transfer case, and fuel tank to prevent damage during off-roading. The Hill-Start Assist Control (HAC) system prevents the 4runner from rolling backwards on inclines and a Downhill Assist Control (DAC, 4WD only) modulates the brakes and throttle automatically without driver inputs for smooth hill descents at very low speeds, both electronic aids are standard on 4WD models.

Major standard features included a tilt and telescoping steering wheel, remote keyless entry, single zone automatic climate control, power driver's lumbar support, power rear tailgate window, and on V8 models a tow hitch receiver bolted directly to the rear frame crossmember. Options included HomeLink, an electrochromic auto-dimming rearview mirror, power moonroof, third row seating, a DVD-based navigation system (loses in-dash CD changer), a 10-speaker JBL Synthesis stereo, and rear seat audio. An optional backup camera system on Limited models used two cameras mounted on the interiors D-pillars to give a wider view when backing up. Some trim levels get two mirrors mounted on the interior D-pillars just inside the rear hatch.

In 2009 with the end of this generation, Toyota Japan ceased production of the Hilux Surf, leaving only the 4Runner available in the subsequent model series.

Safety 
All 4Runners came with Toyota's Star Safety System which includes anti-lock brakes, electronic brakeforce distribution, brake assist, traction control and Vehicle Stability Control. Side torso airbags for the front rows as well as side curtain airbags for the front and rear rows were optional on 2003–2007 models and became standard on 2008 models.

The Insurance Institute for Highway Safety rated the 4Runner as "Good" overall in the frontal offset crash test, "Good" overall in the side impact test on vehicles with side airbags, and the 4Runner received a "Poor" rating for rear impact protection. An IIHS report published in April 2007 shows the 4Runner has one of the lowest death rates for all vehicles on the road at only 13 deaths per million registered vehicle years for the 2003 and 2004 model years. 
Only the Chevrolet Astro, Infiniti G35, and BMW 7 series had lower death rates.

Yearly changes 
 In early 2003, Toyota added an optional Appearance Package for the SR5 model that included color-keyed cladding, bumpers, and liftgate trim. In April 2003, Toyota made the Appearance Package, along with the previously optional fog lamps, running boards, and 16-inch aluminum wheels, standard on the SR5. The Sport Edition also added black running boards and color-keyed trim, replacing the grey cladding and silver-painted grille, door handles and liftgate trim.
 In late 2003 (for the 2004 model year), a Tire Pressure Monitoring System was added as standard equipment. A 3rd row seat became optional on the SR5 and Limited models.
 In 2004 (for the 2005 model year) enhancements were brought to the optional V8 engine and a 5-speed automatic was made standard on the V6 model. Slight changes were made to the exterior including color-keyed bumper trim (replacing the silver painted trim on all colors except Dorado Gold) on the SR5 and Limited; a chrome grille on the SR5; a black roof-rack and running boards (replacing silver) on the Limited; and a redesigned rear spoiler. A Salsa Red Pearl scheme was also introduced for all trim levels, although a similar color scheme was available for third generation models.

 2005 (for the 2006 model year) marked the fourth generation's mid-cycle refresh. The changes included revised front and rear bumpers; a reworked grille; new projector-beam headlamps and LED tail lamps; additional chrome trim on the SR5 model; and a smoked-chrome grille with tubular roof-rack and step bars on the Sport Edition. The revised front bumper features circular fog lights and a relocation of the turn-signals to the headlamp assembly. The redesigned bumper eliminates the rear bumper reflectors. MP3 playback capability and an auxiliary input jack were added to all audio systems. In addition, the Limited model was further differentiated from the other trim levels with the addition of unique 18" wheels and a seat memory system. Shadow Mica was added as a color option. Late in this period, the 1GR-FE V6 engine received a modification to allow for an improved head gasket design which resolved a common head gasket failure.
 In 2006 (for the 2007 model year), the 4Runner remained unchanged.
 In 2007 (for the 2008 model year), the 4Runner received standard rollover sensing side curtain airbags and front row side torso airbags, a switch to disable Vehicle Stability Control, slightly modified front grille design, refinements in the Tire Pressure Monitoring System, and some changes in the seatbelt warning system and brake system control. An Urban Runner Package was also available on the Sport Edition V6 4x4, which added an in dash Tom Tom navigation system, Alcantara inserts in both the front and back seats with dark leather bolstering, the 18" Limited style wheels, a color-keyed front grill and a double-decker cargo system.
 In 2008 (for the 2009 model year) the 4Runner remained unchanged. A Trail Edition package offered an electronic locking rear differential, a switch to enable/disable Advanced Traction Control (A-TRAC) and Bilstein dampers.

Later models offered a DVD Rear Seat Entertainment System (RSES) which used a nine-inch LCD screen and two wireless headphones.

Fifth generation (N280; 2009) 

The fifth-generation 4Runner was unveiled at the State Fair of Texas on September 24, 2009, and went on sale months later. It is built on the same platform as the J150 series Land Cruiser Prado/Lexus GX and the FJ Cruiser. Despite being built in Japan, it was only produced in left-hand drive and it was not sold there or any other RHD markets.

Initially, the 4Runner was available in three trim levels, two of which were available previously. The base SR5 trim as well as the top-of-the-line Limited trim are available as a 2WD or a 4WD. The Trail Edition is only available as a 4WD. The SR5 and Trail Edition 4WDs received a part-time 4WD drive system, while the Limited has full-time 4WD. All models came with Active Traction Control (A-TRAC). The new Trail Edition offers Toyota's Kinetic Dynamic Suspension System (KDSS) and Crawl Control which had previously only been available to premium Toyota vehicles, as well as a rear locking differential like the previous Trail Package.

The 4.0-liter V6 gasoline engine adds Dual VVT-i which improves horsepower, torque and fuel economy, and comes standard in all models. A 2.7-liter I4 was available on 2WD models, but was discontinued after the 2010 model year. The 4.7-liter V8 from the previous generation was not carried over to the fifth generation 4Runner.

Model year changes 
In 2013 (for the 2014 model year), the 4Runner received a facelift, consisting of revised front and rear fascia with projector headlamps and clear-lensed, LED tail-lamps, as well as other minor exterior cosmetic changes. The interior was also updated, with soft-touch door trim, leather-wrapped steering wheel and shift knob, revised dashboard and center stack, and the inclusion of Toyota's Optitron instrument cluster as standard across all trim levels. Brake lines were upgraded for improved pedal feel, and electronic Trailer Sway Control programming included. No driveline changes were made. It is mated to a five-speed automatic ECT transmission.

In 2014 (for the 2015 model year), the TRD Pro trim level was introduced in the United States, with Toyota badging on the front as well as an off-road package as part of the TRD Pro Series. The TRD Pro 4Runner included TRD Bilstein shocks with remote reservoirs, TRD-tuned front springs and TRD front skid plate. For each model year of the TRD Pro, beyond the two colors available on all trims, the TRD Pro is available in an exclusive color. This was 'Inferno Orange' for the 2015 model year, 'Quicksand' for 2016, 'Cement' for 2017, 'Cavalry Blue' for 2018, 'Voodoo Blue' for 2019, 'Army Green' for 2020, 'Lunar Rock' for 2021, Lime Rush' for 2022, and 'Solar Octane' for 2023. All United States models received the Entune touchscreen infotainment system with a 6.1-inch display and a rear backup camera as standard equipment, with optional GPS navigation, SiriusXM Satellite Radio, HD Radio, and Safety Connect. Only the Limited model featured a standard JBL premium amplified audio system.

In 2016 (for the 2017 model year), the 4Runner Trail and Trail Premium were renamed to TRD Off-Road and TRD Off-Road Premium in the United States. These trim levels share the same mechanical functionality of the former Trail edition, but add aesthetic differences and TRD badging to differentiate themselves from the base model.  They do not share the same suspension as the TRD Pro model.

In 2018 (for the 2019 model year), Toyota began offering a 'Nightshade' package based on the Limited trim which blacks out badging, lower front and rear fascia, wheels, and portions of the interior.

In 2019 (for the 2020 model year), Toyota announced that all 4Runner trims will receive Toyota Safety Sense-P (TSS-P) standard as well as two additional rear seat USB ports.  The TRD Pro will have an updated grille design to accommodate the front radar sensor for TSS-P. All United States models received an updated Entune 3.0 infotainment system with a larger, higher-resolution touchscreen display, Apple CarPlay and Android Auto smartphone integration and Amazon Alexa integration, 4G LTE internet access powered by Verizon Wireless, Safety Connect, and standard SiriusXM Satellite Radio and optional HD Radio. The TRD Pro model receives a JBL premium amplified audio system as standard equipment. The system was previously only available on Limited models, where it remains standard equipment. Most models also feature standard GPS navigation.

In 2021 (for the 2022 model year), Toyota included their smart key system with push button as standard for all trims. The new TRD Sport trim was also added into the lineup. The TRD Sport received the same bumper, 20" wheels and the X-REAS suspension from the Limited. It also includes TRD parts such as the TRD shifter, TRD hood with scoop, TRD badges, and Softex seats with TRD lettering. Unlike the Limited, it is available only with 2WD or part-time 4WD.
Toyota added LED foglights, lowbeams and highbeam headlights as standard for all trims for the first time. Blind spot monitor and rear cross traffic alert were added as standard for most trims. The TRD Pro now gets standard multi-terrain monitor. Using strategically placed cameras, the system lets the driver check surroundings on the trail, with the ability to spot potential obstacles not easily seen from the cabin. The Limited trim adds a standard Panoramic View Monitor, which is similar to the multi-terrain monitor on the TRD Pro. The Limited grade and TRD models also add a premium Multi-Information Display. All trims receives rear occupancy alert as standard. 
Lime Rush is the new exclusive paint for the 2022 model year TRD Pro.

In 2022 (for the 2023 model year), the 40th Anniversary Special Edition is a limited model for the North American market producing 4,040 units, with three exterior colors, and standard four-wheel-drive. Solar Octane paint is exclusive to the 2023 model year TRD Pro.

Safety 

1 vehicle structure rated "Poor"
2 strength-to-weight ratio: 4.11

Sales

References

External links 

  (US)

4Runner
Cars introduced in 1984

1990s cars
2000s cars
2010s cars
2020s cars
Compact sport utility vehicles
Mid-size sport utility vehicles
Rear-wheel-drive vehicles
All-wheel-drive vehicles